The 2003 Air Canada Cup was the first edition of the women's ice hockey tournament. It was held from 6–8 February 2003 in Hannover, Germany. The Canadian under-22 national team won the tournament, going undefeated over three games.

Tournament

Results

Final table

External links
Tournament on hockeyarchives.info

2002-03
2002–03 in women's ice hockey
2002–03 in Swiss ice hockey
2002–03 in German ice hockey
2002–03 in Canadian women's ice hockey
2002–03 in Finnish ice hockey
2003